Jazz Magazine is a French magazine dedicated to jazz. The magazine was created in 1950 by Nicole and Eddie Barclay and Jacques Souplet. Frank Ténot - who had left Jazz Hot to join Jazz Magazine - and Daniel Filipacchi became directors of the magazine soon after its creation, becoming owners in 1956. The magazine was based in Paris and was published on a monthly basis. In 2009 it was combined with another jazz magazine, Jazzman.

References

Anne Legrand and Véronique Pernin, "Frank Ténot (2):Les années Jazz Mag", in So What, 31 January 2004

External links
Official website

1950 establishments in France
2009 disestablishments in France
Defunct magazines published in France
French-language magazines
Jazz magazines
Magazines established in 1950
Magazines disestablished in 2009
Magazines published in Paris
Monthly magazines published in France
Music magazines published in France